Marco Puntoriere (born 1 August 1991) is an Italian footballer who plays as a forward for Serie D club F.C. Francavilla.

Career
Born in Reggio Calabria, Calabria, Puntoriere joined Internazionale in 2005. That season he won the champion with Giovanissimi Nazionali team. In 2007, he left Inter's Allievi Regionali team and loaned to Pro Sesto along with Andrea Bavena, Cristiano Biraghi, Samuele Beretta, Marco Buonanno, Nicolò De Cesare, Mattia Dell'Aera, Domenico Maiese, Davide Tremolada, Giovanni Kyeremateng (until January), Fabio Perissinotto (since January) and Luca Profeta (since January). In the next season, he left for Benevento along with Alessio Lanotte. In July 2009, he was signed by Serie B club Mantova. He also played once against Inter in 2009–10 Campionato Nazionale Primavera.

After the club went bankrupt in 2010, he was signed by Seconda Divisione club Catanzaro. He made his first start in round 6, partnered with Stefano Morello and played 3 more games as starting line-up in round 7, 9 and 11.

In January 2011 he left for Sambonifacese
and on 31 August 2011, he was signed by Vibonese.

On 5 December 2019, Puntoriere moved to Serie D club F.C. Francavilla.

References

External links
 Football.it Profile 
 

Italian footballers
Inter Milan players
S.S.D. Pro Sesto players
Benevento Calcio players
Mantova 1911 players
U.S. Catanzaro 1929 players
A.C. Sambonifacese players
U.S. Vibonese Calcio players
Celano F.C. Marsica players
S.S.D. Acireale Calcio 1946 players
Cavese 1919 players
F.C. Francavilla players
Serie D players
Eccellenza players
Association football forwards
Sportspeople from Reggio Calabria
1991 births
Living people
U.S. Castrovillari Calcio players
Footballers from Calabria